The Honor of the Press is a 1932 American Pre-Code crime film directed by B. Reeves Eason and starring Edward J. Nugent, Rita La Roy and Dorothy Gulliver. It was produced as a second feature for release by Mayfair Pictures. The film's sets were designed by the art director Paul Palmentola.

Synopsis
Corrupt Roger Bradley buys a newspaper in order to promote his own shady dealings and denigrate the work of the city's Police Commissioner. A cub reporter on the paper discovers that Bradley and one of the other reporters are both involved in major crime.

Cast
Edward J. Nugent as Daniel E. Greely, Cub Reporter
Rita La Roy as Daisy Tellem, Gossip Columnist
Dorothy Gulliver as June Bonner, the Girlfriend
Wheeler Oakman as Roger Bradley, Crooked Newspaper Owner
Russell Simpson as City Editor Dan Perkins
John Ince as Police Commissioner Drake
Charles K. French as Dodson (editorial writer)
Reginald Simpson as Larry Grayson (reporter)
Franklin Parker as Sorrell "Sorry" Simpson (photographer)
Franklyn Farnum as Mr. Sampson (publisher of The Herald)

References

Bibliography
 Pitts, Michael R. Poverty Row Studios, 1929–1940: An Illustrated History of 55 Independent Film Companies, with a Filmography for Each. McFarland & Company, 2005.

External links

1932 films
American crime drama films
American black-and-white films
American romantic drama films
1932 crime drama films
Films directed by B. Reeves Eason
1930s English-language films
1930s American films